The Royal Ballet of Cambodia is a Cambodian dance company, known for its luxurious costumes and accessories decorated in gold and silver, accompanied by a soft dancing style. 

Through the work of Queen Sisowath Kosamak, the Cambodian royal family created it as a national treasure to showcase Cambodian dancers and Khmer traditional dance.  In 2003, during the reign of King Norodom Sihanouk, this dance was placed on the UNESCO World Heritage List.

Teacher Salute Ceremony in Royal Ballet  
Performed before the dance troupe enters the stage, the Teacher Salute Ceremony is a tribute to the teachers who trained them and is dedicated to the spirit that controls the spirit in each of the characters of the Royal Ballet, bidding them to ensure that their performances are smooth, confident and unobstructed. This ceremony originates from an ancient forerunner when the royal dance troupe had to offer blessings before they took the stage.

The Journey of Cambodia Royal Ballet  

The choreographed troupe reflects "Auguste Rodin"s special encounter with the beauty of Khmer dance that he discovered during the official visit to France of the King Sisowath of Cambodia. In 1906, rode and followed the Khmer ballet dancers from Paris to Marseille with their return to Phnom Penh. later he painted at least 150 paintings by Cambodian dancers, copying and interpreting them as ballet dances, with a keen interest in his and his partner's work, mostly watercolour paintings in diversity.  Of this rare refinement.
An unpublished illustration of an unpublished piece of dance on the part of Rodin's work, which is not known to the public, this particular book is the fruit of the Franco-Cambodian collaboration, showing the joy of both cultures.

Royal Ballet of Cambodia Friendship Dance 
In 1959, Queen Sisowath Kosamak visited the United States to introduce Khmer national culture and classical dance through exhibition performances of the Khmer-American Friendship Ballet, originally titled The Ballet of Khmer-American Friendship 1959. Later in 1960, the cultural ambassadorship program continued in China under the same name The Ballet of Khmer-Chinese Friendship 1960. During the this period, the company toured Europe, propelled by the popularity of its principal dancer, Norodom Bopha Devi, the granddaughter of Queen Sisowath Kossamak and daughter King Norodom Sihanouk. Though the Royal Ballet originally had no men due to the perception that male dancers did not perform with the refinement of women, contemporary performances include men in livelier roles such as the monkey and Moni Ey-Sey.

The three groups of the Cambodia Royal Ballet  
The sub-classes of the four main roles all perform in the same type of dancing style of the class they belong to. Other female character types, such as the apsara, kinnari, or mermaid, follow the same dancing style as the  role but with subtle differences in gestures; the main difference being costume.

Most roles are performed by female dancers, but the role of monkeys was transferred to men under the guidance of Queen Sisowath Kosssamak. Other roles performed by men include hermits and animals such as horses and mythical lions.

The Cast 
The cast is divided into two forms, Neang as the female character and Neay Rong as the male character, which is described as follows:

Pin Peat musical band

Musical instruments

Music pieces 
Khmer classical dance uses particular pieces of music for certain events, such as when a dancer enters or leaves a scene, or performs certain actions, such as flying or walking. These musical pieces are arranged to form a suite. New pieces of music are rarely created.

Below is a select list of music pieces used in the repertoire:

 : a song of blessing used for propitiation, often used to commence a performance
 : used for the introduction of a character or a group of dancers in a scene
 : used to present a character's departure from the scene; leaving the stage
 : lit., euphonic ; music characterized by the constant percussion of drums and small cup-shaped cymbals; used to present an action such as commencing a journey or flying
 : music used in tune with aquatic recreation (e.g. dancers miming the action of rowing a boat)
 : lit., "royal bathing of the Mon"; a song used to represent a character dressing up their appearance
 : used to show the grace and beauty of a character wielding his weapon
 : - lit., "cream color", in reference to complexion, a soft and slow feminine melody





Singing group

Etymology 

Western names for this dance tradition, such as Cambodian court dance, often make reference to the royal court, as the tradition was performed and maintained by attendants of the royal palaces. As a performing art, it is formally referred to as the Royal Ballet of Cambodia (le Ballet royal du Cambodge in French) by UNESCO, Cravath, Brandon, and others in the academic field, although this term may also refer to the National Dance Company of Cambodia. The term Khmer classical dance is also used alongside "Royal Ballet of Cambodia" in publications by UNESCO and the above-mentioned authors.

In Khmer, it is formally known as Robam Preah Reach Trop (lit. "dances of royal wealth") or Lakhon Preah Reach Trop (lit. "theatre of royal wealth"). It is also referred to as Lakhon Luong (lit. "the king's theatre"). During the Lon Nol regime of Cambodia, the dance tradition was referred to as Lakhon Kbach Boran Khmer (lit. "Khmer theatre of the ancient style"), a term alienating it from its royal legacy.

Khmer classical dancers, as a whole, are frequently referred to as apsara dancers by laymen; this usage would be incorrect with the modern form of the dance, as the apsara is just one type of character among others in the repertoire. Regardless, the tradition's romanticized affiliation with the apsaras and devatas of the ruins of Angkor still persists.

History

Angkor and pre-Angkor era

One of the earliest records of dance in Cambodia is from the 7th century, where performances were used as a funeral rite for kings. In the 20th century, the use of dancers is also attested in funerary processions, such as that for King Sisowath Monivong. During the Angkor period, dance was ritually performed at temples. The temple dancers came to be considered as apsaras, who served as entertainers and messengers to divinities. Ancient stone inscriptions describe thousands of apsara dancers assigned to temples and performing divine rites as well as for the public. The tradition of temple dancers declined during the 15th century, as the Siamese kingdom of Ayutthaya raided Angkor. When Angkor fell, its artisans, Brahmins, and dancers were taken captive to Ayutthaya.

French colonial era

Dancers of the court of King Sisowath were exhibited at the 1906 Colonial Exposition in Marseilles at the suggestion of George Bois, a French representative in the Cambodian court. Auguste Rodin was captivated by the Cambodian dancers and painted a series of water colors of the dancers. George Groslier, the French-colonial director of the Phnom Penh Musée Sarraut (today the National Museum), had 're-invented' large parts of the ballet through his studies of the bas-reliefs of Angkor Wat.

Post-independent Cambodia
Queen Sisowath Kossamak became a patron of the Royal Ballet of Cambodia. Under the Queen's guidance, several reforms were made to the royal ballet, including choreography. Dance dramas were dramatically shortened from all-night spectacles to about one hour in length. Prince Norodom Sihanouk featured the dances of the royal ballet in his films. 
 
The dance tradition suffered setbacks during the Khmer Rouge regime, during which many dancers were put to death in the genocide. Although 90 percent of all Cambodian classical artists perished between 1975 and 1979 after the fall of the Khmer Rouge, those who did survive wandered out from hiding, found one another, and formed "colonies" in order to revive their sacred traditions, under the leadership of former prima ballerina Voan Savay. Khmer classical dance training was resurrected in the refugee camps in eastern Thailand with the few surviving Khmer dancers. Many dances and dance dramas were also recreated at the Royal University of Fine Arts in Cambodia.

In 2003 it was inducted into the UNESCO Intangible Cultural Heritage Lists.

Performance 

During the era of the French Protectorate of Cambodia and before, it was customary for guests of the royal palace to receive a performance of the royal ballet. In propitiation ceremonies, it was performed at Wat Phnom and the Silver Pagoda and Throne Hall of the Royal Palace. For entertainment, performances were often staged inside the pavilions of royal palaces. In Phnom Penh, the Moonlight Pavilion was built for and is still used occasionally for classical dance performances. Nowadays, venues for performances by the Royal Ballet include the Chenla Theatre and the Chaktomuk Conference Hall, designed by architect Vann Molyvann during the Sangkum Reastr Niyum era. Tourist restaurants in Cambodia, notably in Siem Reap, also serve as venues for classical dance performances by amateur troupes.

Stage and props 

The traditional stage for classical dance drama performances contains a table with a decorative pillow, sometimes laid on an Oriental rug or carpet. This table of low stature, called a krae (lit. "bed"), is constant throughout the performance and thus is used as a prop that represents many places and things (a bed, a throne, living quarters, etc.).

In many dance dramas, characters often wield weapons such as bows, swords, staves, and clubs. In some dances, dancers hold items such as flower garlands, fans, and gold and silver flowers as a tribute (see ).

Movement and gestures 
Khmer classical dancers use stylized movements and gestures to convey meaning and tell a story. These gestures are often vague and abstract, though some may be easily understood. Dancers do not sing or generally speak, except in some dance dramas where there are brief instances of speech by the dancers.

Hand gestures in Khmer classical dance are called  (meaning "style"). These hand gestures form a sort of alphabet and represent various things from nature such as fruit, flowers and leaves. They are used in different combinations and transitions with accompanying movement of the legs and feet to convey different thoughts and concepts. The way gestures are presented, the position of the arm, and the position of the hand relative to the arm can affect their meaning. Gestures are performed in different manners depending on the character type.

Costume 
Classical dance costumes are highly ornate and heavily embroidered, sometimes including sequins and even semi-precious gems. Most of the costumes are thought to be representative of what divinities wear, as reflected in the art style of the post-Angkor period. Various pieces of the costume (such as shirts) have to be sewn onto the dancers for a tight fit.

Female costume 

The  is wrapped around the lower body in a sarong-like fashion, then pleated into a band in the front and secured with a gold or brass belt. In the current style, part of the pleated brocade band hangs over the belt on the left side of the belt buckle, which is a clear distinction from Thai classical dance costumes where this pleated band is tucked into the belt to the right of the belt buckle. The usual embroidery pattern for the sbai these days is a diamond-shaped floral pattern, but in the past there were more variations of floral patterns. Under the sbai is a silk undershirt or bodice worn with a short sleeve exposed on the left arm.

Jewelry for the female role includes a large, filigree square pendant of which is hung by the corner, various types of ankle and wrists bracelets and bangles, an armlet on the right arm, and body chains of various styles.

Male costume 

Male characters wear costumes that are more intricate than the females, as they require pieces, like sleeves, to be sewn together while being put on. They are dressed in a  like their female counterpart; however, it is worn differently. Knee-length pants are worn underneath, displaying a wide, embroidered hem around the knees. On the end of their shoulders are a sort of epaulette that arches upwards like Indra's bow (known as ). Other components of the male costumes are three richly embroidered banners worn around the front waist.

Males wear the same ankle and wrist jewelry as females, but with the addition of an extra set of bangles on the wrist and no armlets.

Headdress 

There are several types of crowns that denote characters' ranks. The  (Groslier romanizes this as ), reserved for princes and generals, is a circlet-like crown with a faux knot in the back. The  is worn by princesses and often by maidens of significance in a dance if they happen to not be of royal rank. Some characters' headdressings include ear ornaments as well as earrings. Characters such as the yahks and the monkeys wear masks. Yahks and monkeys of royal rank wear masks with a  attached.

Floral adornments 

Dancers are traditionally adorned with fragrant flowers, although sometimes fresh flowers are substituted with faux flowers. The floral tassel is traditionally made of Jasminum sambac strung together with Michelia flowers, being either Michelia × alba or Michelia champaca. Sometimes, dancers will wear jasmine garlands fit for the wrists. The apsara role is most often adorned with the flowers of either Plumeria obtusa or white cultivars of Plumeria rubra; sometimes plumerias are tied along the back of their hair.

Repertoire 

According to The Cambridge Guide to Asian Theatre (1997), the Royal Ballet's repertoire contained approximately 40 dances and 60 dance dramas. Since the restoration of the Royal Ballet in the 1979, some of the old repertoire was recreated and several new dances were also created, most notably robam monosanhchettana by the late Chea Samy. As of recent years, new dance dramas have been created by the Royal Ballet, such as Apsara Mera. Sophiline Cheam Shapiro has also introduced new repertory to Khmer classical dance, although they are not part of the traditional royal repertoire and mainly have been performed in Western venues.

Dance dramas 

Many of the dance dramas have analogs in the lakhon nai dance genre of Thailand but do not share the same choreography or exact storyline. During the time of Queen Kossamak, several dance dramas were re-choreographed and shortened such as Roeung Preah Thong-Neang Neak; this drama, among others, would be recreated in 2003.

The plots of many dance dramas often concern a male character who rescues a damsel in distress or destined love presented with obstacles. The traditional repertoire portrays mythology or traditional tales and may sometimes include religious concepts such as karma.

Select repertory of dance dramas 

{{columns-list|colwidth=30em|
  (Ramakerti): Ramayana
 
 : Panji
 : Kakati-Jataka
 : Aniruddha
 : Chitralekha
 
 
 
}}

 Dances 

They can serve several purposes, such as honoring, ritualistic functions (e.g. securing the kingdom's fortune and prosperity), and blessing.

The 'apsara dance' of today was created under the guidance of Queen Kossamak Nearireath. Its costume is based on the bas-relief of apsaras on temple ruins but much of it, including its music and gesture, is not unique from other classical Khmer dances that probably do not date back to the Angkor period.

 Select repertory of dances 

 Robam Apsara (របាំអប្សរា)
 Robam Tep Monorom (របាំទេពមនោរម្យ)
 Robam Chun Por (របាំជូនពរ)
 Robam Makar (របាំមករ)
 Robam Sovann Maccha (របាំសុវណ្ណមច្ឆា)
 Robam Moni Mekhala or Mekhala-Reamesor (របាំមណីមេខលា)

 Glossary 

 Media 

 Gallery 

 Non-fiction 

 Cravath, Paul (2008). Earth in Flower - The Divine Mystery of the Cambodian Dance Drama, DatAsia Press
 Groslier, George et al. (2011). Cambodian Dancers - Ancient and Modern, DatAsia Press
 Heywood, Denise (2009). Cambodian Dance Celebration of the Gods, River Books
 Loviny, Christophe (2003). The Apsaras of Angkor, Sipar: Jazz Editions

 Fiction 
 Meyer, Charles (2009). Saramani: Cambodian Dance, DatAsia Press
 Lee, Jeanne M. (1994). Silent Lotus, Farrar, Straus and Giroux
 Lord, Michael (2006). Little Sap and Monsieur Rodin, Lee & Low Books

 Selected discography 
 Musical Sources – Royal Music Of Cambodia (1971) by Jacques Brunet; contains a condensed recording of the Buong Suong dance drama featuring the goddess Manimekhala
 Homrong: Classical Music From Cambodia (2004) by Chum Ngek; contains music pieces and suites used by the royal ballet

 See also 

 Theatre of Cambodia
 Dance in Cambodia
Robam Apsara
Robam Moni Mekhala
Robam Sovann Maccha
 Dance in Thailand
 Earth in Flower Khmer shadow theatre
 UNESCO Intangible Cultural Heritage Lists

 References 

 Bibliography 

 Banham, Martin (1995). The Cambridge Guide to Theater, Cambridge University Press
 Becker, Elizabeth (1998). When the War Was Over: Cambodia and the Khmer Rouge Revolution, PublicAffairs
 Bois, George (1913). Les Danseuses cambodgiennes en France, Imprimerie d'Extrême-Orient
 Bowers, Faubion. (1956). Theatre in the East, New York T. Nelson
 Brandon, James R. (1967). Theatre in Southeast Asia. Harvard University Press
 Cravath, Paul (1968). The Ritual Origins of the Classical Dance Drama of Cambodia, Asian Theatre Journal, Vol. 3, No. 2 (Autumn, 1986), pp. 179–203
 Fletcher, Peter (2001). World Musics in Context: A Comprehensive Survey of the World's Major Musical Cultures, Oxford University 
 Jacobsen, Trudy (2008). Lost Goddesses: Denial of Female Power in Cambodian History, Nordic Institute of Asian Studies
 Sasagawa, Hideo (2005). Post/colonial Discourses on the Cambodian Court Dance, Southeast Asian Studies, Vol. 42, No. 4, March 2005
 Falser, Michael (2013). From a colonial reinvention to postcolonial heritage and a global commodity: performing and re-enacting Angkor Wat and the Royal Khmer Ballet, International Journal of Heritage Studies, May 2013

 Notes Notes in this section are referenced from the bibliography above. Unverified notes Notes in this section reference material produced by laymen or reference material not generally considered a legitimate source on the subject matter at hand. They are unverified and not peer-reviewed.''

External links

General information 
 Cambodian Classical Dance by Chamroeun Yin
 Nginn-Karet Foundation Teaches Sacred Dance at Banteay Srey
 The Language of Khmer Classical Dance | The Cambodia Daily
 The Near Extinction of Cambodian Classical Dance | UCLA Center for Southeast Asian Studies
 The Khmer Dance Project
 NY Times | Auguste Rodin and the Royal Ballet of Cambodia
 Khmer Arts | Founded by Sophiline Cheam Shapiro

Image galleries 
 Anders Jiras | Photography of Cambodian dance performances
 Earth in Flower | Photo gallery of 186 Cambodian dance photos arranged by chronology and topic
 Cambodian Dancers | Historical info and 169 original etchings from George Groslier's 1913 book Danseuses Cambodgiennes

Asian dances
Articles containing video clips